Ravi V. Bellamkonda (born 1968) is an Indian-American biomedical engineer and academic administrator. Since 2021, he has served as Provost and Executive Vice President for Academic Affairs at Emory University in Atlanta, Georgia. Bellamkonda was previously Vinik Dean of the Pratt School of Engineering at Duke University.

Bellamkonda's laboratory explores the interplay of biomaterials and the nervous system for the development of peripheral nerve regeneration, brain electrode interfacing and brain tumor therapies. His research was the subject of a BBC science report, "Cancer: 'Tumor Monorail' Can Lead Cancers to Their Doom" He was also the subject of a feature profile in the Britain-based international journal, The Engineer.

Bellamkonda served president of the American Institute of Medical and Biological Engineering (AIMBE) for the 2014-2016 term.  He has served as a member of the board for the Biomedical Engineering Society (BMES), and is on the editorial board for several scientific journals. He advises several biomedical engineering-related departments and programs nationally as a member of their external advisory boards.

Education and career 
Bellamkonda earned his Bachelor of Engineering degree in Biomedical Engineering at Osmania University in May 1989. He completed his Ph.D. in Medical Science and Biomaterials from Brown University in June 1994. From 1994 to 1995, Bellamkonda was a Markey Post-Doctoral Research Fellow in the Department of Brain and Cognitive Sciences at the Massachusetts Institute of Technology with Jerry Schneider and Sonal Jhaveri.

In 1995, he went on to become the Elmer L. Lindseth assistant professor at Case Western Reserve University in Cleveland, Ohio then advanced to associate professor in 2001.

In 2003, Bellamkonda joined Georgia Tech as an associate professor of biomedical engineering, and in 2005, he was promoted to professor in the Wallace H. Coulter Department of Biomedical Engineering, a joint department created by Emory's School of Medicine and the Georgia Tech College of Engineering.

From 2006 to 2013, he was the Carol Ann and David D. Flanagan Chair in Biomedical Engineering at Georgia Tech. the Carol Ann and David D. Flanagan Chair in Biomedical Engineering and Georgia Cancer Coalition Distinguished Scholar

In 2008, he was named deputy director of research at the Georgia Tech/Emory Center for the Engineering of Living Tissues (GTEC), an NSF funded engineering research center. Afterwards, in 2010, he was named associate vice president for research at the Georgia Institute of Technology, a position he held until 2013.

In 2013, Bellamkonda was named the department chair of the Wallace H. Coulter Department of Biomedical Engineering at Georgia Tech and Emory University. On August 1, 2016, he became Vinik Dean at Duke University.

It was reported he will become Provost and Executive Vice President for Academic Affairs at Emory University on July 1, 2021, where he will have faculty appointments in the Department of Biology and the Wallace H. Coulter Department of Biomedical Engineering.

Research 
Bellamkonda's primary area of research is the application of biomaterials to the human nervous system, including spinal nerve repair, neural interfaces, and brain tumor therapy.

Professional services 
 Board of directors, Biomedical Engineering Society  (2012-2014)
 BMES Fellow, Biomedical Engineering Society
 President, American Institute of Medical and Biological Engineering (AIMBE) 
 Vice-president at large, American Institute for Medical and Biological Engineering (2012-2013)
 Board of directors, American Institute for Medical and Biological Engineering 
 Charter Member, CSR BNVT Study Section, National Institute of Health
 Member of CREATE-X executive team at Georgia Tech (April 2015)

Honors, awards, and recognition 
 Eureka Award, National Cancer Institute, 2010-2014
 Georgia Cancer Coalition Distinguished Scholar
 Global Indus Technovator Award, IBC, Massachusetts Institute of Technology, January 2006
 Elected Fellow, AIMBE, February 2006
 Associate editor, IEEE Transactions on Neural Systems and Rehabilitation Engineering, January 2006
 Elected  Fellow, Institute of Physics, September 2004 – Present
 Member of editorial board, Journal of Neural Engineering, September 2003
 Tumor Rail [nanofiber technology], 2014, CBS News, Nature Materials journal 
 Clemson Award for Applied Research, 2014, Society for Biomaterials

References

1968 births
Living people
American biomedical engineers
Brown University alumni
Case Western Reserve University faculty
Emory University faculty
Georgia Tech faculty
Massachusetts Institute of Technology School of Science faculty
Osmania University alumni
Fellows of the American Institute for Medical and Biological Engineering
Fellows of the Biomedical Engineering Society
American academics of Indian descent
Duke University faculty
Telugu people
People from Andhra Pradesh
People from Guntur district